Surrender is a 1987 Bangladeshi film starring Jashim, Shabana and Bulbul Ahmed. Male playback singer Andrew Kishore and music director Alam Khan earned Bangladesh National Film Awards.

Music
The film's music was composed by Alam Khan, with lyrics by Gazi Mazharul Anwar. The song "Sobai To Bhalobasha Chai" by Andrew Kishore became famous.

Awards
Bangladesh National Film Awards
 Best Music Director 1987 – Alam Khan
 Best Male Playback Singer 1987 – Andrew Kishore

References

Bengali-language Bangladeshi films
Films scored by Alam Khan
1987 films
1980s Bengali-language films